Israel Sadan (Hebrew: ישראל סדן, born 4 April 1947) is a former Commander of MAGAV  (the Israeli Border Police) and a former mayor of Hadera who was convicted of bribing city council members.

Biography
Sadan was born in Hadera. He joined the Israeli Police after completing his compulsory military service.
In the early 1990s he became the commander of the Haifa district of the Israeli police and in 1995 he was appointed to be the commander of MAGAV.
As commander of Magav he opened the ranks for female soldiers.

After retirement he quickly joined the political world and ran for Mayor of Hadera in 1998.
He won the elections with more than 60% of support.

After a successful first term, Sadan ran again in 2003 and won with 43% of the votes verses 40% that obtained his former deputy Haim Avitan.

Despite his victory he struggled to obtain a supportive coalition in the City council.
Due to this situation he addressed 3 city council members and offered them money in return for their support. A Police investigation was open soon after.
Israel Sadan resigned and Avitan took his place.

In November 2005, Sadan was sentenced to 8 months of Prison time and 7 months probation time.

References

Living people
Israeli government officials convicted of crimes
Israeli people convicted of bribery
Israeli police officers
Israeli politicians convicted of corruption
Jewish Israeli politicians
Mayors of places in Israel
People from Hadera
Year of birth missing (living people)
Israeli politicians convicted of crimes